Germaine Ohaco (born 8 December 1962) is a Chilean former professional tennis player.

Ohaco reached a best singles world ranking of 162 on the professional tour. She qualified for the singles main draw of the 1982 US Open and featured in three doubles rubbers for the Chile Federation Cup team in 1984.

Her niece, Dominique Ohaco, is an Olympic skier.

References

External links
 
 
 

1962 births
Living people
Chilean female tennis players
20th-century Chilean women